Nicholas G. Eyre (June 16, 1959 – November 15, 2018) was a former American college and professional football player who was an offensive tackle in the National Football League (NFL).  Eyre played college football for Brigham Young University, and earned All-American honors.  He played professionally for the NFL's Houston Oilers for a single season in 1981.

Eyre was born in Las Vegas and died in St. George, Utah.

Eyre attended Brigham Young University, where he played for the BYU Cougars football team from 1977 to 1980.  As a senior in 1980, he was recognized as a consensus first-team All-American.

References

External links
NFL.com player page

1959 births
2018 deaths
All-American college football players
American football offensive tackles
BYU Cougars football players
Houston Oilers players
Chicago Blitz players
Players of American football from Nevada
Sportspeople from the Las Vegas Valley